Balm of Gilead was a rare perfume used medicinally, that was mentioned in the Hebrew Bible, and named for the region of Gilead, where it was produced. The expression stems from William Tyndale's language in the King James Bible of 1611, and has come to signify a universal cure in figurative speech. The tree or shrub producing the balm is commonly identified as Commiphora gileadensis. However, some botanical scholars have concluded that the actual source was a terebinth tree in the genus Pistacia.

History

Hebrew Bible

In the Bible, balsam is designated by various names:  (bosem),  (besem),  (ẓori),  (nataf), which all differ from the terms used in rabbinic literature.

After having cast Joseph into a pit, his brothers noticed a caravan on its way from Gilead to Egypt, "with their camels bearing spicery, and balm, and myrrh" (Gen. ). When Jacob dispatched his embassy into Egypt, his present to the unknown ruler included "a little balm" (Gen. ). During the final years of the Kingdom of Judah, Jeremiah asks "Is there no balm in Gilead?" (Jer. 8:22). Still later, from an expression in Ezekiel , balm was one of the commodities which Hebrew merchants carried to the market of Tyre. According to I Kings , balsam (Hebrew: bosem) was among the many precious gifts of the Queen of Sheba to King Solomon.

Greco-Roman
In the later days of Jewish history, the neighborhood of Jericho was believed to be the only spot where the true balsam grew, and even there its culture was confined to two gardens, the one twenty acres in extent, the other much smaller (Theophrastus).

According to Josephus, the Queen of Sheba brought "the root of the balsam" as a present to King Solomon (Ant. 8.6.6).

In describing Palestine, Tacitus says that in all its productions it equals Italy, besides possessing the palm and the balsam (Hist. 5:6); and the far-famed tree excited the cupidity of successive invaders. By Pompey it was exhibited in the streets of Rome as one of the spoils of the newly conquered province in 65 BCE; and one of the wonderful trees graced the triumph of Vespasian in 79 CE. During the invasion of Titus, two battles took place at the balsam groves of Jericho, the last being to prevent the Jews in their despairing frenzy from destroying the trees. Then they became public property, and were placed under the protection of an imperial guard; but history does not record how long the two plantations survived.

According to Pliny (Hist. Nat. 12:54), the balsam-tree was indigenous only to Judea, but known to Diodorus Siculus (3:46) as a product of Arabia also. In Palestine, praised by other writers also for its balsam (Justinus, 36:3; Tacitus, Hist. 5:6; Plutarchus, Vita Anton. c. 36; Florus, Epitome bellorum 3.5.29; Dioscorides, De materia medica 1:18) this plant was cultivated in the environs of Jericho (Strabo, 16:763; Diodorus Siculus 2:48; 19:98), in gardens set apart for this use (Pliny, Hist. Nat. 12:54; see Josephus, Ant. 14.4.1; 15.4.2; War 1.6.6); and after the destruction of the state of Judea, these plantations formed a lucrative source of the Roman imperial revenue (see Diodorus Siculus 2:48).

Pliny distinguishes three different species of this plant; the first with thin, capillaceous leaves; the second a crooked scabrous shrub; and the third with smooth rind and of taller growth than the two former. He tells us that, in general, the balsam plant, a shrub, has the nearest resemblance to the grapevine, and its mode of cultivation is almost the same. The leaves, however, more closely resemble those of the rue, and the plant is an evergreen. Its height does not exceed two cubits. From slight incisions made very cautiously into the rind (Josephus, Ant. 14.4.1; War 1.6.6) the balsam trickles in thin drops, which are collected with wool into a horn, and then preserved in new earthen jars. At first it is whitish and pellucid, but afterwards it becomes harder and reddish. That is considered to be the best quality which trickles before the appearance of the fruit. Much inferior to this is the resin pressed from the seeds, the rind, and even from the stems (see Theophrastus, Hist. Plant. 9:6; Strabo 16:763; Pausanias 9.28.2). This description, which is not sufficiently characteristic of the plant itself, suits for the most part the Egyptian balsam-shrub found by Belon in a garden near Cairo. The plant, however, is not indigenous to Egypt, but the layers are brought there from Arabia Felix; Prosperus Alpinus has published a plate of it.

Dioscorides (De materia medica) attributes many medical properties to balsam, such as expelling menstrual flow; being an abortifacient; moving the urine; assisting breathing and conception; being an antidote for aconitum and snakebite; treating pleurisy, pneumonia, cough, sciatica, epilepsy, vertigo, asthma, and gripes (sharp bowel pains).

In the era of Galen, who flourished in the second century, and travelled to Palestine and Syria purposely to obtain a knowledge of this substance, it grew in Jericho and many other parts of the Holy Land.

Rabbinic literature; Talmud

In the Talmud, balsam appears as an ointment which was a highly praised product of the Jericho plain (Shab. 26a). However, its main use was medicinal rather than cosmetic. Rav Yehudah composed a special blessing for balsam: "Who creates the oil of our land" (Ber. 43a). Young women used it as a perfume to seduce young men (Lam. R. 4:18; Shab. 26b). After King Josiah hid away the "holy oil" with which the kings of Judah were anointed, balsam oil was used in its stead (Ker. 5b). In the messianic era, the righteous will "bathe in 13 rivers of balsam" (TJ, Av. Zar. 3:1, 42c).

Christian
The Christian rite of confirmation is conferred through the anointing with chrism, which is traditionally a blend of olive oil and balsam. Balm seems to have been used everywhere for chrism at least from the sixth century.

Arab
The balsam, carried originally, says Arab tradition, from Yemen by the Queen of Sheba, as a gift to Solomon, and planted by him in the gardens of Jericho, was brought to Egypt by Cleopatra, and planted at Ain-Shemesh (Ain Shams), in a garden which all the old travellers, Arab and Christian, mention with deep interest.

The Egyptian town of Ain Shams was renowned for its balsam garden, which was cultivated under the supervision of the government. During the Middle Ages the balsam tree is said to have grown only there, though formerly it had also been a native plant in Syria. According to a Coptic tradition known also by the Muslims, it was in the spring of Ayn Shams that Mary, the mother of Jesus, washed the swaddling clothes of the latter on her way back to Palestine after her flight to Egypt. From that time onwards, the spring was beneficent, and during the Middle Ages balsam-trees could only produce their precious secretion on land watered by it. The story is reminiscent of Christian legends about the Fountain of the Virgin in Jerusalem.

Prosper Alpinus relates that forty plants were brought by a governor of Cairo to the garden there, and ten remained when Belon travelled in Egypt, but only one existed in the 18th century. By the 19th century, there appeared to be none.

Modern
The German botanist Schweinfurth (1836–1925) claimed to he have reconstructed the ancient process of balsam production.

At present the tree Commiphora gileadensis grows wild in the valley of Mecca where it is called . Many strains of this species are found, some in Somalia and Yemen.

Lexicon

Hebrew tsori
In the Hebrew Bible, the balm of Gilead is tsori or tseri ( or ). It is a merchandise in Gen. 37:25 and Ez. 27:17, a gift in Gen. 43:11, and a medicament (for national disaster, in fig.) in Jer. 8:22, 46:11, 51:8. The Hebrew root z-r-h means "run blood, bleed" (of vein), with cognates in Arabic (an odoriferous tree or its gum), Sabaean, Syriac (possibly fructus pini), and Greek (in meaning). The similar word tsori denotes the adjective "Tyrean", i. e. from the Phoenician city of Tyre.

Many attempts have been made to identify the tsori, but none can be considered conclusive. The Samaritan Pentateuch (Gen. 37:25) and the Syriac bible (Jer. 8:22) translate it as wax (cera). The Septuagint has , "pine resin". The Arabic version and Castell hold it for theriac. Lee supposes it to be "mastich". Luther and the Swedish version have "salve", "ointment" in the passages in Jer., but in Ezek. 27:17 they read "mastic". Gesenius, Hebrew commentators (Kimchi, Junius, Tremellius, Deodatius), and the Authorized Version (except in Ezek. 27:17, rosin) have balm, balsam, Greek , Latin .

Hebrew nataf
Besides the tseri, another Hebrew word, nataph, mentioned in Ex. 30:34, as an ingredient of the holy incense, is taken by Hebrew commentators for opobalsamum; this, however, is perhaps rather stacte.

Hebrew bosem
It is usually translated as "spice, perfume, sweet odour, balsam, balsam-tree". The Greek βάλσαμον can be interpreted as a combination of the Hebrew words  (בַּעַל) "lord; master; the Phoenician god Baal" and shemen (שֶׁמֶן) "oil", thus "Lord of Oils" (or "Oil of Baal").

Greek balsamon
Greek authors use the words  (Theophrastus, Aristotle) for the balsam plant and its resin, while Galen, Nicander and the Geoponica consider it an aromatic herb, like mint. The word is probably Semitic. ὁπο-βάλσᾰμον (Theophrastus) is the juice of the balsam tree. βαλσαμίνη (Dioscorides) is the balsam plant. Palladius names it βάλσαμος and also has βαλσαμουργός, a preparer of balsam. Related are ξῠλο-βάλσᾰμον (Dioscorides, Strabo) "balsam-wood", and καρπο-βάλσᾰμον (Galen) "the fruit of the balsam".

Latin balsamum
Latin authors use  (Tacitus, Pliny, Florus, Scribonius Largus, Celsus, Columella, Martialis) for the balsam tree and its branches or sprigs, as well as for its resin, opobalsamum (Pliny, Celsus, Scribonius Largus, Martialis, Statius, Juvenal) for the resinous juice of the balsam tree, and xylobalsamum (Pliny, Scribonius Largus, Celsus) for balsam wood, all derived from Greek.

Plants
Assuming that the tsori was a plant product, several plants have been proposed as its source.

Mastic
Rauwolf and Pococke found the plant occurring at Joppa.

Zukum
 and Rosenmüller thought that the pressed juice of the fruit of the zukum-tree (Elaeagnus angustifolia L.) or the myrobalanus of the ancients, is the substance denoted; but Rosenmüller, in another place, mentioned the balsam of Mecca (Amyris opobalsamum L., now Commiphora gileadensis (L.) C.Chr.) as being probably the tsori. Zukum oil was in very high esteem among the Arabs, who even preferred it to the balm of Mecca, as being more efficacious in wounds and bruises. Maundrell found zukum-trees near the Dead Sea. Hasselquist and Pococke found them especially in the environs of Jericho. In the 19th century, the only product in the region of Gilead which had any affinity to balm or balsam was a species of Eleagnus.

Terebinth
Bochart strongly contended that the balm mentioned in Jer. 8:22 could not possibly be that of Gilead, and considered it as the resin drawn from the terebinth. The Biblical terebinth is Hebrew eloh, Pistacia terebinthus L.

Pine
The Greek word ῥητίνη, used in the Septuagint for translating tsori, denotes a resin of the pine, especially Pinus maritima (πεύκη). The Aramaic tserua has been described as the fruit of Pinus pinea L., but it has also been held for stacte or storax. The Greek  is a species of Pinaceae Rich.

Cancamon
Nat. 12.44; 12.98). Cancamon has been held for Commiphora kataf, but also as Aleurites laccifer (Euphorbiaceae), Ficus spec. (Artocarpeae), and Butea frondosa (Papilionaceae).

Sanskrit kunkuma is saffron (Crocus sativus).

Balm of Mecca
Peter Forsskål (1732–1763) found the plant occurring between Mecca and Medina. He considered it to be the genuine balsam-plant and named it Amyris opobalsamum Forsk. (together with two other varieties, Amyris kataf Forsk. and Amyris kafal Forsk.). Bruce found the plant occurring in Abyssinia. In the 19th century it was discovered in the East Indies also.

Linnaeus distinguished two varieties: Amyris gileadensis L. (= Amyris opobalsamum Forsk.), and Amyris opobalsamum L., the variant found by Belon in a garden near Cairo, brought there from Arabia Felix. More recent naturalists (Lindley, Wight and Walker) have included the species Amyris gileadensis L. in the genus Protium. Botanists enumerate sixteen balsamic plants of this genus, each exhibiting some peculiarity.

There is little reason to doubt that the plants of the Jericho balsam gardens were stocked with Amyris gileadensis L., or Amyris opobalsamum, which was found by Bruce in Abyssinia, the fragrant resin of which is known in commerce as the "balsam of Mecca". According to De Sacy, the true balm of Gilead (or Jericho) has long been lost, and there is only "balm of Mecca".

The accepted name of the balsam plant is Commiphora gileadensis (L.) Christ., synonym Commiphora opobalsamum.

Cedronella
Cedronella canariensis, a perennial herb in the mint family, is also known as Balm of Gilead, or Herb of Gilead.

Flammability
Balsam oil was too volatile and flammable to be used as fuel. In the Talmud, a case is cited of a woman planning and carrying out the murder of her daughter-in-law by telling her to adorn herself with balsam oil and then light the lamp (Shab. 26a).

According to the 13th-century (?) Liber Ignium (Book of Fires), balsam was an ingredient of ancient incendiaries akin to Greek fire.

References

Bibliography

Encyclopedias, dictionaries, lexica
CBTEL – 
EI – 
EJ – 
GEL – 
HEL – 
NCE – 
OLD – 
SED – 

Other works

External links
 

Incendiary weapons
Perfume ingredients
Traditional medicine
Resins
Biblical archaeology
Ethnobotany
Gilead